Landscape with the Temptation of St Anthony is a 1617 painting by Roelandt Savery (Flemish, 1576 - 1639), now in the Getty Museum in Los Angeles.

There are multiple other paintings with this title, including 
 Landscape with the Temptation of St Antony by Claude Lorrain

References

1617 paintings
Landscape paintings
J. Paul Getty Museum